Trapania rudmani is a species of sea slug, a dorid nudibranch, a marine gastropod mollusc in the family Goniodorididae.

Distribution
This species was described from Otago, New Zealand. It is found throughout New Zealand but has not been reported elsewhere.

Description
The body of this goniodorid nudibranch is translucent with a frosted white surface. The rhinophores, gills, oral tentacles and tail are slightly more heavily marked with white pigment. The lateral papillae are also white, but with an orange or yellow stripe on the outer sides.

Ecology
Trapania rudmani feeds on Entoprocta which often grow on sponges and other living substrata.

References

Goniodorididae
Gastropods described in 1981